Nyein Chan (born 2 June 1991) is a Burmese professional footballer who plays as a defender for Ranong United.

Club Career 
In July 2022 Nyein Chan signed for Ranong United in Thai League 2

International career
In 2019, Chan was called up by Myanmar for the 2022 World Cup Qualification Stage and made his debut against Nepal, followed by appearances against Tajikistan and Mongolia.

International

References

1994 births
Living people
Burmese footballers
Myanmar international footballers
Association football defenders
Burmese expatriate sportspeople in Thailand